Anarta sabulorum is a species of moth of the family Noctuidae. It is found in North Africa, the Near East and Middle East, Central Asia, Western China and Mongolia.

Adults are on wing from January to April. There is one generation per year.

Subspecies
Anarta sabulorum sabulorum
Anarta sabulorum distincta
Anarta sabulorum rhodina (Xinjiang)
Anarta sabulorum segnis
Anarta sabulorum pulverata (Malta)

External links
 Hadeninae of Israel

sabulorum
Moths of Africa
Moths of Asia
Moths described in 1882